The 2003 Swedish Golf Tour, known as the Telia Tour for sponsorship reasons, was the 18th season of the Swedish Golf Tour, a series of professional golf tournaments for women held in Sweden and Finland.

Linda Wessberg and Maria Bodén each won two events and Wessberg narrowly won the Order of Merit ahead of Nina Reis.

Schedule
The season consisted of 12 tournaments played between May and September, where one event was held in Finland.

Order of Merit

Source:

See also
2003 Swedish Golf Tour (men's tour)

References

External links
Official homepage of the Swedish Golf Tour

Swedish Golf Tour (women)
Swedish Golf Tour (women)